R v Malmo-Levine; R v Caine [2003] 3 S.C.R. 571, 2003 SCC 74, is a leading constitutional decision of the Supreme Court of Canada. The Court rejected a constitutional challenge of the criminalization of marijuana.

Background
The decision involves two cases. The first was where David Malmo-Levine, a "marijuana/freedom activist",  ran an organization in East Vancouver called the "Harm Reduction Club", which attempts to reduce the harm associated with marijuana use by educating users and the public about the drug and provide the drug at cost. In December 1996 the police raided the Harm Reduction Club and seized 316 grams of marijuana charging Malmo-Levine with possession for the purpose of trafficking.

The second case involved the 1993 arrest of Victor Caine for possession of marijuana. Caine was in his van by the ocean when two RCMP officers approached him. He was stopped and a 0.5 gram were found in his possession.

Both Caine and Malmo-Levine challenged the constitutionality of the criminalization of marijuana under the Narcotics Control Act.

Malmo-Levine's argument focused on whether there should be a requirement of harm for criminal law. He argued that the constitutional power to enact criminal law under section 91(27) of the Constitution Act, 1867 is limited to conduct that causes harm. He further argued that the "harm principle" should be a principle of fundamental justice under section 7 of the Canadian Charter of Rights and Freedoms.

Opinion of the Court
Gonthier and Binnie JJ., writing the majority, rejected all the arguments for the requirements of harm under section 91(27) of the Constitution Act, 1867 and section 7 of the Charter. They held that Parliament need not establish harm but only a reasonable apprehension of harm.

Gonthier and Binnie looked towards R v Hauser, which held that narcotics were a new matter not considered in 1867 and so falls under the peace, order and good government power. They suggest that this case was likely wrong as narcotics is clearly a matter of criminal law.

The criminal law power, they state, includes the protection of vulnerable groups. Thus the government is able to control activities for the protection of drug users and society.

See also
 List of Supreme Court of Canada cases (McLachlin Court)

External links
 

Section Seven Charter case law
Canadian criminal case law
Supreme Court of Canada cases
2003 in Canadian case law
Cannabis law
Cannabis law reform in Canada